Akisada (written: 秋定) is a Japanese surname. Notable people with the surname include:

, Japanese actress

Akisada (written: 顕定) is also a masculine Japanese given name. Notable people with the name include:

, Japanese samurai

Japanese-language surnames
Japanese masculine given names